Patrick Olusegun Odegbami (born 27 August 1952), often shortened as Segun Odegbami, is a Nigerian former professional footballer who played as a forward

Early life
Odegbami was born on 27 August 1952 in Lagos, Nigeria to Jacob Adebola Odegbami (1911–2003) and Beatrice Bintu Abeke Odegbami (née Olotu) (1921–2018), one of their seven children. His father was an older half-brother of Nigerian author Amos Tutuola. Odegbami was brought up in the northern city of Jos, Plateau State along with many other members of his extended family.

Playing career
Odegbami won 46 caps and scored 23 goals for the Nigeria national team which he guided to its first Africa Cup of Nations title at the 1980 tournament in his homeland. Nicknamed Mathematical, he was famous for his skill on the ball, speed and precision of his crosses from the right wing. He played for IICC Shooting Stars of Ibadan his entire career, from 1970 to 1984. His last game was the 1984 African Champions Cup final defeat to Zamalek of Egypt. The original source of the nickname "Mathematical" was because Segun Odegbami attended and graduated from Nigeria's premier technical institution; The Polytechnic, Ibadan where he studied Engineering.

Post-playing career
In 2007 Odegbami appeared on Nigerian Who Wants To Be A Millionaire hosted by Frank Edoho.  He played a game for charity with Zebrudaya and donated his winnings to The Little Saints’ Orphanage on the Strong Tower Mission.

In September 2015, Odegbami stated his intention to run for FIFA presidency.

In June 2022, he launched a radio station called Eagles 7 Sports Radio 103.7 FM in Nigeria.

Personal life
Odegbami has a daughter who sings under the name May7ven.

His two other brothers were also involved with football at other levels. His older brother Dele Odegbami played football in the old Western Region for his school (Ebenezer Grammar School, Abeokuta), the West Academicals, his university, UNN Nsukka, and briefly for Stationery Stores football club of Lagos. His other brother, Wole Odegbami, is also a former national team player, playing on the Nigerian national team for 11 years. He is a columnist in Nigeria.

Honours
Shooting Stars
Nigerian Premier League: 1976, 1980, 1983
Nigerian FA Cup: 1977, 1979
African Cup Winners' Cup: 1976

Nigeria
All-Africa Games: Silver medal 1978
Africa Cup of Nations: 1980

Individual
 Africa Cup of Nations goalscorer: 1978, 1980 (with Khaled Labied) with 3 goals
 Africa Cup of Nations Team of the Tournament: 1980

References

External links

1952 births
Living people
Africa Cup of Nations-winning players
Association football forwards
Nigerian footballers
Yoruba sportspeople
Nigeria international footballers
Sportspeople from Abeokuta
Shooting Stars S.C. players
1978 African Cup of Nations players
1980 African Cup of Nations players
The Polytechnic, Ibadan alumni
African Games silver medalists for Nigeria
African Games medalists in football
Competitors at the 1978 All-Africa Games
20th-century Nigerian people